Today, Tomorrow, Forever is a 1964 album by Nancy Wilson.

Track listing
 "One Note Samba" (Antonio Carlos Jobim, Newton Mendonça, Jon Hendricks) – 2:00
 "Go Away Little Boy" (Gerry Goffin, Carole King) – 2:51
 "Unchain My Heart" (Bobby Sharp) – 2:07
 "I Left My Heart in San Francisco" (George Cory, Douglass Cross) – 2:23
 "Wives and Lovers" (Burt Bacharach, Hal David) – 2:02
 "The Good Life" (Sacha Distel, Jack Reardon) – 2:29
 "What Kind of Fool Am I?" (Leslie Bricusse, Anthony Newley) – 2:11
 "I Can't Stop Loving You" (Don Gibson) – 2:37
 "On Broadway" (Barry Mann, Cynthia Weil, Jerry Leiber and Mike Stoller) – 1:49
 "Our Day Will Come" (Mort Garson, Bob Hilliard) – 2:16
 "Call Me Irresponsible" (Jimmy Van Heusen, Sammy Cahn) – 2:29
 "Tonight May Have to Last Me All My Life" (Donald Borzage, Johnny Mercer) – 2:53

Personnel
Nancy Wilson – vocals
Lou Blackburn – trombone
Bill Perkins – tenor saxophone
John Gray – guitar
Bill Plummer – double bass
Lou Levy – piano, celeste
Jack Wilson – electronic organ, piano
Milt Holland – percussion, conga
Kenny Dennis – drums, arranger

References

1964 albums
Nancy Wilson (jazz singer) albums
Albums produced by Dave Cavanaugh
Capitol Records albums